The 1922 Florida Gators football team represented the Florida Gators of the University of Florida during the 1922 Southern Conference football season. The season was law professor William G. Kline's third and last year as the head coach of the Florida Gators football team.  Kline's 1922 Florida Gators finished 7–2 overall, and 2–0 in their first year as members of the new Southern Conference, placing fifth of twenty-one teams in the conference standings.

Despite the undefeated conference record, the team played only two conference opponents (Tulane and Clemson) and so did not rank as co-champion with Vanderbilt, Georgia Tech, and North Carolina.

The 1922 Spalding's Football Guide ranked Florida as the best forward passing team in the country. The team had an unexpected loss early in the season to Furman in a close match, but otherwise the season is notable for visiting Washington D. C. and the White House upon traveling North for the first time to face the Harvard Crimson, and the upset of Tulane.

Before the season
In the first season of the new Southern Conference (SoCon), freshmen were barred from play.

1921 had been the best year in Florida football history. Florida had two of the South's best punters in running backs Ark Newton and Ray Dickson.

Schedule

Season summary

Week 1: Furman

The lone upset of the year happened in the opening game with a 7 to 6 loss to coach Billy Laval's Furman Purple Hurricane.  A muddy and slippery field plagued the first half.  Florida had two touchdowns called back and halfback Case once fell down with a clear field in front of him. The Gators' only score was made in a downpour.

Florida completed just two passes. Furman scored on its only completed pass, a long one of 60+ yards. Ark Newton once failing to kick goal proved to be the difference. As a result of this game, the coaches revised their tactics and strategy.

The starting lineup was: Coleman (left end), Robinson (left tackle), Norton (left guard), Gunn (center), Scott (right guard), Doty (right tackle), Duncan (right end), Barchan (quarterback), Pomeroy (left halfback), Newton (right halfback), Hockenstadt (fullback).

Week 2: Rollins
Again rain and a soggy field hampered play in the second week against the Rollins Tars in Orlando. Florida only rolled up 19 points with the new tactics. Dickson made two touchdowns and Newton one.

The starting lineup was: Coleman (left end), Robinson (left tackle), Norton (left guard), Gunn (center), Scott (right guard), Doty (right tackle), Duncan (right end), Barchan (quarterback), Pomeroy (left halfback), Newton (right halfback), Dickson (fullback).

Week 3: American Legion

Facing many former college football stars, including Hall of Famer Buck Flowers, who netted a 74-yard punt during the contest, Florida defeated American Legion 14–0 in Tampa using much of the new style of play. Stewart Pomeroy scored both touchdowns and Ray Dickson made both extra points. The last touchdown from Pomeroy was "a beautiful run around right end."

Week 4: Howard
In the game against coach Harris Cope's Howard Bulldogs in Gainesville, Florida seemed to find its stride within the coaches' new system, winning 57–0. Coleman broke his collarbone.

The starting lineup was: Coleman (left end), Robinson (left tackle), Byrd (left guard), Gunn (center), Scott (right guard), Doty (right tackle), Duncan (right end), Pomeroy (quarterback), Case (left halfback), Newton (right halfback), Dickson (fullback).

Week 5: at Harvard

In the Gators' first ever game against a traditional northeastern college football power, they traveled north to meet coach Bob Fisher's Harvard Crimson. On their way north the Gators stopped in Washington, D. C. and were greeted by President Warren Harding. 

Harvard subs overwhelmed the Florida team 24 to 0 in front of the largest crowd yet to see the Gators play. One writer spoke of "the desperate rally of Florida's 'Gators against the overwhelming Harvard attack" which despite the loss "showed the 'Gators probably the best team the Gainesville institution has turned out." The stars for Florida that day included backs Ray Dickson and Ark Newton. On the line, Robbie Robinson, "who at times stood Harvard's backs on their heads," played well. "Robinson and Duncan  stood out all afternoon."

The starting lineup was: Hockinstadt (left end), Robinson (left tackle), Byrd (left guard), Gunn (center), Scott (right guard), Doty (right tackle), Duncan (right end), Pomeroy (quarterback), Newton (left halfback), Case (right halfback), Dickson (fullback).

Week 6: Mississippi College

In Tampa on Plant Field, the Gators defeated coach Stanley L. Robinson's Mississippi College Choctaws 58 to 0. Florida played poorly in the first quarter. The highlight of the game was Ark Newton's run of 72 yards in the second quarter.

The starting lineup was: Mounts (left end), Robinson (left tackle), Byrd (left guard), Gunn (center), Scott (right guard), Doty (right tackle), Duncan (right end), Barchan (quarterback), Case (left halfback), Newton (right halfback), Dickson (fullback).

Week 7: at Tulane

In the seventh week of play, Florida defeated coach Clark Shaughnessy's Tulane Green Wave in New Orleans 27 to 6 in an upset. Fullback Ray Dickson was all over the field tackling Tulane's players. He knocked Tulane center Eddie Reed out of the game on a hit which got an unnecessary roughness penalty. 

After the first half ended in a 6–6 tie, the Gators opened up a passing attack in the second half "which could not be stopped." One sportswriter claimed Ark Newton threw 13 completions in a row. "Newton gave the greatest halfback exhibition this season in New Orleans."

The starting lineup was: Hockinstadt (left end), Robinson (left tackle), Byrd (left guard), Gunn (center), Scott (right guard), Doty (right tackle), Duncan (right end), Barchan (quarterback), Newton (left halfback), Case (right halfback), Dickson (fullback).

Week 8: at Oglethorpe

Freezing weather and a stony field in Atlanta made for unexpected trouble against the Oglethorpe Stormy Petrels. Florida defeated the Petrels by just a 12 to 0 score. End Ferdinand H. Duncan scored all of Florida's points. "Albeit Duncan did the damage...most of the credit for the victory should go to Newton."

The starting lineup was: Hockinstad (left end), Robinson (left tackle), Byrd (left guard), Gunn (center), Scott (right guard), Doty (right tackle), Duncan (right end), Barchan (quarterback), Case (left halfback), Newton (right halfback), Dickson (fullback).

Week 9: Clemson

The Gators defeated the Clemson Tigers 47 to 14 using a repertoire of shifting tactics. They also used hard line plunges and forward passes. "Newton and Pomeroy provided the thrills from the Florida side." A description of the game reads "The whistle frequently found Ark Newton, Florida's star on his feet with four or five of the Carolinians clinging around him and the others smothered under the Florida poundage."

The starting lineup was: Mounts (left end), Robinson (left tackle), Byrd (left guard), Gunn (center), Scott (right guard), Doty (right tackle), Hockenstad (right end), Barchan (quarterback), Pomeroy (left halfback), Case (right halfback), Newton (fullback).

Postseason

Awards and honors
The season trumped the accomplishments even of last year's team. Newton was selected for the All-Southern team of Ed Hebert of the Times-Picayune in 1922.

The 1922 freshman team was a Southern champion, coached by Florida native and former Yale All-American John Acosta.

Kline's departure
After the 1922–1923 school year, Kline resigned to pursue a legal career, and returned to the University of Nebraska, where he was the head coach of the Nebraska Cornhuskers basketball and baseball teams, and later became a published author of books on coaching football, basketball and baseball. He was replaced at Florida by assistant Van Fleet.

Personnel

Line

Backfield

Coaching staff
Head coach: William G. Kline
Assistant coach: James Van Fleet
Freshman coach: John Acosta
Manager: James R. Boyd
Assistant manager: Frank Evans

See also
1922 College Football All-Southern Team
1922 Southern Conference football season

Notes

References

Bibliography
 
 
 

Florida
Florida Gators football seasons
Florida Gators football